Digital Duke is an album by Mercer Ellington and the Duke Ellington Orchestra that won the Grammy Award for Best Large Jazz Ensemble Album in 1988.

Track listing

Personnel
 Mercer Ellington – conductor
 Clark Terry – flugelhorn, trumpet
 Lew Soloff – flugelhorn, trumpet
 Barry Hall – flugelhorn, trumpet
 Ron Tooley – flugelhorn, trumpet
 Kamau Adilifu – flugelhorn, trumpet
 Al Grey – trombone
 Britt Woodman – trombone
 Chuck Connors – bass trombone
 Eddie Daniels – clarinet, tenor sax
 Herman Riley – clarinet, tenor sax
 Charles Owens – clarinet, bass clarinet, baritone sax
 Norris Turney – alto sax
 Branford Marsalis – tenor sax
 Roland Hanna – piano
 Gerald Wiggins – piano
 Bucky Pizzarelli – guitar
 J. J. Wiggins – bass
 Louie Bellson – drums
 Ricky White – drums

Production
 Dave Grusin – executive producer
 Larry Rosen – executive producer
 Mercer Ellington – producer
 Michael Abene – producer
 Ed Rak – engineer
 Rebecca Everett – assistant engineer
 Josiah Gluck – digital mixing, editing
 Ted Jensen – digital mastering
 Leonard Feather – liner notes

References

Grammy Award for Best Large Jazz Ensemble Album
Mercer Ellington albums
GRP Records albums
1987 albums